Thurman is a ghost town in Chase County, Kansas, United States.  It was located southeast of Matfield Green in the rural Flint Hills.

History
Founded in 1874, it experienced a period of decline that concluded in its abandonment in 1944.  In 1900, the community was composed of over fifty households, and it included a post office, stores, schools, and a church.

A post office existed in Thurman from August 24, 1874, to January 31, 1909.

Geography
The elevation of the Thurman site is 1,394 feet (425 m), and it is located at  (38.1008519, -96.5169547), in the southeastern part of the county.  Today, the site is located in southern Matfield Township.

References

Further reading

External links
 Chase County maps: Current, Historic, KDOT

Former populated places in Chase County, Kansas
Populated places established in 1874
Former populated places in Kansas
1874 establishments in Kansas